The 2011 Bryant Bulldogs football team represented Bryant University in the 2011 NCAA Division I FCS football season. The Bulldogs were led by eighth-year head coach Marty Fine and played their home games at Bulldog Stadium. They are a member of the Northeast Conference. They finished the season 7–4, 5–3 in NEC play to finish in third place.

Schedule

References

Bryant
Bryant Bulldogs football seasons
Bryant Bulldogs football